Jean-Laurent Cochet (28 January 1935 – 7 April 2020) was a French director and actor.

Biography
He was best known for starring in movies such as A Thousand Billion Dollars and Fort Saganne.
He was an important teacher for acting. Hundreds of his students have succeeded in theater and cinema: Gérard Depardieu, Richard Berry, Claude Jade, Isabelle Huppert, Daniel Auteuil, Emmanuelle Béart, Carole Bouquet, Fabrice Luchini, etc. On 7 April 2020, he died from COVID-19 during the pandemic.

Filmography

Honors

2006 Legion of Honour
2012 Ordre des Arts et des Lettres

Awards

1975 : Trophée Béatrix Dussane
1984 Prix du Brigadier

References

External links

1935 births
2020 deaths
French National Academy of Dramatic Arts alumni
French male film actors
Troupe of the Comédie-Française
People from Seine-Saint-Denis
Recipients of the Legion of Honour
French-language film directors
Chevaliers of the Légion d'honneur
French theatre directors
Commandeurs of the Ordre des Arts et des Lettres
Deaths from the COVID-19 pandemic in France